SAFARI-1 is a 20 MW light water-cooled, beryllium reflected, pool-type research reactor, initially used for high level nuclear physics research programmes and was commissioned in 1965.

The reactor is owned and operated by South African Nuclear Energy Corporation (NECSA) at their facility in Pelindaba, South Africa.

The reactor is a tank in pool type reactor and is designed to run on enriched uranium.  Currently the fuel in use is the remains of the decommissioned South African nuclear weapons.

History 
The reactor was built in cooperation with the Atoms for Peace program run by the US DOE in the 1950s and '60s.

Planning started in 1960 and construction occurred between 1961 and 1965. In March 1965 the reactor was commissioned and initially operated at 6.75 MW, a limitation imposed by the capacity of the secondary cooling circuit. Output was increased to 20 MW in 1968 after the secondary cooling circuit was upgraded.

Initially the reactor was fueled with HEU supplied by the United States, but in 1975 exports of HEU from the USA to South Africa was suspended in protest of South Africa's nuclear weapons program and the construction of the Valindaba Y-plant. In order to conserve the available fuel supply, reactor output was reduced to 5 MW and operating hours were dramatically reduced 

In 1979 the Valindaba Y-plant started producing 45% HEU and in 1981 the first fuel assemblies from Valindaba were made available to fuel SAFARI-1. Operating hours were increased, but power was kept at 5 MW until 1993 when it was increased to 10 MW and eventually 20 MW due to the commercialisation of NECSA operations.

The reactor was shut down for repairs in 1988 after a water leak was detected in the pool.

In 2005 it was announced that the reactor is to be converted from using High Enriched uranium to Low Enriched uranium as fuel.

Use 
One of Safari-1s primary uses is the production of radio isotopes for radiopharmacology use in nuclear medicine, specifically the production of molybdenum-99.

Radio isotopes are distributed through NTP Radioisotopes, a subsidiary company of NECSA

See also 
 Pelindaba
 South African Nuclear Energy Corporation
 Atoms for Peace

References

External links 
 SAFARI-1 at the Nuclear Threat Initiative
 NTP Radioisotopes
 Reduced Enrichment for Research and Test Reactors Program
 The Woodrow Wilson Center's Nuclear Proliferation International History Project or NPIHP is a global network of individuals and institutions engaged in the study of international nuclear history through archival documents, oral history interviews and other empirical sources.

Nuclear research reactors
Nuclear technology in South Africa
South African nuclear sites
Research in South Africa
Buildings and structures in North West (South African province)
1965 in South Africa
South Africa–United States relations